The Chaos Theory is the only EP by American rapper Jumpsteady. It was advertised in the booklet of Tunnel of Love and was originally scheduled for a 1997 release, but was delayed several years. It was eventually released on July 23, 2002.

Track listing

Personnel 
Information taken from AllMusic.

Musicians 
 Jumpsteady — vocals
 Blaze — vocals
 Guido — bass
 Insane Clown Posse — vocals
 Jumpsteady — vocals, liner notes
 Jamie Madrox — vocals
 Twiztid — vocals
 Violent J — vocals

Additional personnel 
 Fritz the Cat — programming, producer, engineer
 "Ninjas In Action" beat sampled from Chips theme song

References 

2002 debut EPs
Jumpsteady albums
Psychopathic Records EPs